Darius McGhee (born June 2, 1999) is an American college basketball player for the Liberty Flames of the ASUN Conference.

High school career
McGhee attended Roxboro Community School in Roxboro, North Carolina for three years. His sophomore season was cut short after he broke his arm. As a junior, McGhee emerged as one of the top scorers in the nation. He averaged 36.4 per game, leading the state in scoring, and became the first player in state history to score at least 1,000 points in a single season. McGhee transferred to Blue Ridge School in Saint George, Virginia and helped his team win the VISAA Division II state title.

College career
As a freshman at Liberty, McGhee averaged 7.8 points per game. He averaged 9.5 points and four rebounds per game as a sophomore. On February 27, 2021, McGhee scored a season-high 34 points in a 94–78 win over Bellarmine, matching the program record of eight three-pointers, to claim the ASUN regular season title. He was named ASUN Player of the Year and was a unanimous First Team All-ASUN selection. On March 7, McGhee posted 21 points and eight rebounds in a 79–75 victory over North Alabama at the ASUN tournament final. He was named tournament MVP. As a junior, McGhee averaged 15.5 points, 2.1 assists and 4.4 rebounds per game. On January 15, 2022, he scored a school-record 48 points, including 37 in the second half, in a 78-75 win against Florida Gulf Coast. On February 26, McGhee scored 47 points in a 100-93 overtime win against Kennesaw State. At the close of the 2021–22 season, McGhee was again named ASUN Player of the Year.His 142 three pointers in 2021 is 12th most ever in a single season for Division I basketball.

During his final season of eligibility, McGhee reached several major statistical milestones. First, on November 26, 2022, he passed the 2,000-point milestone for his career. Then, on February 4, 2023, he became the Flames' all-time leading scorer, surpassing Karl Hess, who had played for the Flames from 1976–1980 when Liberty was an NAIA member. On February 22, he became the ASUN's all-time scoring leader, surpassing Willie Jackson, who played for Centenary from 1980–1984 when the ASUN was known as the Trans America Athletic Conference. In the same game, he also became the fourth Division I men's player to score 500 three-pointers in his career. On February 27, 2023, McGhee was named the ASUN Player of the Year for the third consecutive season, earning Centenary's Jackson as the only players in league history to earn the award that many times. He was also named to a third consecutive all-conference first team selection.

Career statistics

College

|-
| style="text-align:left;"| 2018–19
| style="text-align:left;"| Liberty
| 36 || 0 || 21.3 || .384 || .319 || .909 || 2.7 || 1.1 || .9 || .3 || 7.8
|-
| style="text-align:left;"| 2019–20
| style="text-align:left;"| Liberty
| 34 || 34 || 33.0 || .437 || .386 || .830 || 4.0 || 1.7 || .9 || .1 || 9.5
|-
| style="text-align:left;"| 2020–21
| style="text-align:left;"| Liberty
| 29 || 29 || 30.2 || .452 || .408 || .854 || 4.4 || 2.1 || .8 || .4 || 15.5
|-
| style="text-align:left;"| 2021–22
| style="text-align:left;"| Liberty
| 33 || 33 || 33.7 || .456 || .390 || .881 || 4.5 || 3.6 || 1.2 || .2 || 24.6
|- class="sortbottom"
| style="text-align:center;" colspan="2"| Career
| 132 || 96 || 29.4 || .439 || .380 || .869 || 3.8 || 2.1 || 1.0 || .2 || 14.1

See also
 List of NCAA Division I men's basketball career 3-point scoring leaders
 List of NCAA Division I men's basketball season 3-point field goal leaders

Footnotes

References

External links
Liberty Flames bio

1999 births
Living people
American men's basketball players
Basketball players from North Carolina
Blue Ridge School alumni
Liberty Flames basketball players
People from Roxboro, North Carolina
Point guards